Sanjeev Kumar Balyan (born 23 June 1972) is an Indian politician and member of the Bharatiya Janata Party. He has been elected to Lok Sabha from the Muzaffarnagar constituency in 2014 and 2019.

He was appointed as the Minister of State for Agriculture and food processing in the National Democratic Alliance government in May 2014. Then, in July 2016, he was moved to be Minister of State for Water Resources, River Development & Ganga Rejuvenation, under Minister Uma Bharti. He was moved out of the ministry in September 2017 but he again made a comeback in the ministry when he defeated Ajit Singh in a very close contest in the 2019 elections. Close connections in Uttarakhand state called right hand Saurabh Bansal. He is appointed as minister of State for Animal Husbandry, Fisheries and Dairying on 30 May 2019.

He is a veterinarian by qualification and did his Ph.D. in Veterinary Anatomy.

He comes from Kutbi village in Muzaffarnagar district.

Early life and education
He obtained his degrees, including a doctorate in Veterinary Anatomy, from CCS Haryana Agricultural University. During his education in CCSHAU, he was a student leader and was very active in politics. He served in Government of Haryana as an assistant professor and veterinary surgeon.

Political career
Balyan is a Bharatiya Janata Party politician who was elected as Member of Parliament, Lok Sabha from Muzaffarnagar in 2014 defeating Kadir Rana of Bahujan Samaj Party by more than four lakh votes. He won 2019 Indian general elections from Muzaffarnagar defeating Ajit Singh of Rashtriya Lok Dal.(https://eci.gov.in)

He became the Minister of State for Agriculture and Food Processing in 2014. In 2016, he became Minister of State for Water Resources, River Development, and Ganga Rejuvenation.

Balyan is an accused in the 2013 Muzaffarnagar riots, although he was already in jail as a precautionary measure taken by administration when the riots took place. According to a May 2014 report in The Times of India:

In November 2015 a bailable warrant was issued against Balyan. Balyan was charged with offences under the Indian Penal Code sections 188 (violating prohibitory orders), 353 (assault or criminal force to deter public servant from discharging his duty) and 341 (wrongful restraint). In December 2015, Balyan surrendered before a Muzzafarnagar court and obtained bail. Balyan has denied his involvement in the riots and has claimed that he has been booked in a false case and accused of doing things he never did.

In May 2019, Balyan became Minister of State for Animal Husbandry, Dairying and Fisheries.

References

Lok Sabha members from Uttar Pradesh
Indian veterinarians
Narendra Modi ministry
1972 births
Living people
Bharatiya Janata Party politicians from Uttar Pradesh
2013 Muzaffarnagar violence
Far-right politicians in India
India MPs 2014–2019
People from Muzaffarnagar district
India MPs 2019–present